Thalassotalea agariperforans  is a Gram-negative, agarolytic and motile bacterium from the genus of Thalassotalea which has been isolated from the South Sea near the Geoje Island in Korea.

References

External links
Type strain of Thalassotalea agariperforans at BacDive -  the Bacterial Diversity Metadatabase

 

Alteromonadales
Bacteria described in 2014